State Route 329 (SR 329) is a state highway located in southeastern Ohio. The route is signed as a north–south route though the shape of the road is more of a backwards C. The southern terminus of SR 329 is in the Rome Township community of Guysville at US 50 and SR 32. After traveling north through the Athens County communities of Stewart and Amesville, the route briefly enters Morgan County before re-entering Athens County and ending at SR 13 in the village of Trimble.

History
SR 329 was certified and paved in 1932, originally routed from Guysville to Stewart, in southeast Ohio. In 1962, the highway was extended to Trimble, passing through Amesville and using the former route of SR 280.

Major intersections

References

329
Transportation in Athens County, Ohio
Transportation in Morgan County, Ohio